Gothenburg High School (GHS) is a secondary school located in Gothenburg, Nebraska, United States.

About
GHS is paired with Gothenburg Junior High School in the same building.

Students are offered a curriculum that includes agriculture, art, business/computer, English, family & consumer, foreign language, industrial technology, mathematics, music, physical education, science, and social studies, as well as student aid, driver education, independent studies, and online courses.

Clubs include art club, FFA, journalism, National Honor Society, one acts, speech, and student council.

Athletics
The Swedes are members of the Southwest Conference and sport the colors of cardinal and white. The school offers competition in basketball, cheerleading, cross country, football, golf, softball, track & field, volleyball, wrestling, band, and choir.

Notable alumni
 Milan Creighton, former NFL player
 Jay Novacek, former NFL player

References

External links
 
 Gothenburg Public Schools

Public high schools in Nebraska
Schools in Dawson County, Nebraska